Ular is a Nepali novella by Nayan Raj Pandey. It was first published in Tanneri—a bi–monthly magazine  in 1996 (2053 BS) then as a book in 1998 (2055 BS) by Tanneri Prakshan. The book was reprinted in 2012 by FinePrint Publication which has been printing the book ever since. Pandey completed writing the book in four days.

The title of the book translates to imbalance in a horse-cart caused by more load at the back than at the front. The book has been immensely popular since its publication and has been reprinted multiple times. The book shows the social inequality in Nepali society and how poor people are exploited by richer and powerful ones. The exploitation of subaltern people and the negligence of the state towards those people is depicted in this book. The book has also been included in the curriculum of undergraduate of Nepali Major in Tribhuvan University.

Synopsis 
The story is set in Mid-western Terai region (present–day Lumbini Province) of Nepal. Premlawla is a poor tanga driver and is a supporter of Rajendra Lal in the national election. Premlawla also participates in the election rally for Premlalwa with his tanga during which his horse gets sick. However, Rajendra Lal loses to Shanti Raja in the election. Premlawla is asked to participate in the victory rally of Shanti Raja with the promise of a daily wage but Premlawla's sick horse dies during the rally. Premlawla decides to ask for help with Shanti Lal but is unable to meet with him since he has already left for Kathmandu. Then Premlawla decides to ask Rajendra Lal but Rajendra Lal refuses to help. Instead, Rajendra Lal suggests to him that he sell his only piece of land. Premlawla is cheated on the price of land. With the money obtained, Premlawla decides to go to Kathmandu to meet Shanti Lal and ask for his horse's compensation. In Kathmandu, Premlalwa meets a writer Nirakar Prasad, who borrows money with Premlawla promising to return back soon and also to publish his story but Nirakar Prasad runs away with the money.

In parallel, there is a story about Draupadi, a sex worker from Badi community and Premlawla's love interest. Premlalwa wants to marry Draupadi but is unable because he is destitute. Draupadi is exploited by the richer people of the village. The books shows the helplessness of poor people in the society and how they are exploited by the rich and powerful.

Characters 

 Premlawla, a poor tanga driver
 Rajendra Lal, a local politician
 Shanti Raja, Rajendra Lal's rival
 Draupadi, a sex worker from Badi community and Premlawla's romantic interest
 Sita, Draupadi's mother
 Nirakar Prasad, a writer Premlalwa meets in Kathmandu

Translation and adaptation 
The book is translated into English by Dinesh Kafle.

The novella was adapted into a play by Garden Theatre Production in collaboration with Katha Ghera. The play was staged at Kausi Theatre and directed by Che Shankar.  Sabeer Churaute and Sarita Giri depicted the role of Premlawa and Draupadi respectively.

References

External links 

 Official Publisher's Page

1998 books
21st-century Nepalese books
Nepalese books
Nepalese novels
Books by Nayan Raj Pandey
1998 Nepalese novels
Novels set in Nepal
Nepali-language novels
Nepalese novels adapted into plays